Legendele Olimpului (The Legends of Olympus) (1960) is a children's book by Romanian author Alexandru Mitru. It is a re-writing  of well-known Greek myths in two volumes:
Volume 1: The Gods
Volume 2: The Heroes

References

External links

1960 non-fiction books
Children's short story collections
References on Greek mythology
1960 children's books
Greek mythology